Ndut may refer to:
the Ndut people
the Ndut language mujhadAbbas 
the Ndut rite of passage